Govi-Altai ( /) is an aimag (province) in western Mongolia.

Transportation 
The Altai Airport (LTI/ZMAT) has one paved runway and is served by regular flights to Arvaikheer, Bayankhongor and Ulaanbaatar. The new arrival/departure building was opened to the public in 2013.

Administrative subdivisions 

The capital Altai is geographically located in Yesönbulag sum, and not to be confused with the Altai sum in the south of the aimag.

*Includes the capital of Govi-Altai Aimag, Altai City.

 
Altai Mountains
Provinces of Mongolia
States and territories established in 1940
1940 establishments in Mongolia